Coal Township, Ohio may refer to:

Coal Township, Jackson County, Ohio
Coal Township, Perry County, Ohio

Ohio township disambiguation pages